The 2017–18 Buffalo Bulls men's basketball team represented the State University of New York at Buffalo during the 2017–18 NCAA Division I men's basketball season. The Bulls, led by third-year head coach Nate Oats, played their home games at Alumni Arena in Amherst, New York as members of the East Division of the Mid-American Conference. They finished the season 27–9, 15–3 in MAC play to win the MAC East Division and regular season championships. they defeated Central Michigan, Kent State, and Toledo to win the MAC tournament championship. As a result, they received the conference's automatic bid to the NCAA tournament. As the No. 13 seed in the South region, they upset Arizona in the First Round before losing to Kentucky in the Second Round.

Previous season
The Bulls finished the 2016–17 season 17–14, 11–7 in MAC play to finish in a tie for second place in the East Division. As the No. 3 seed in the MAC tournament, they lost in the quarterfinals to Kent State.

Offseason

2017 recruiting class

Roster

Schedule and results
The Bulls participated in the Cayman Islands Classic held in the Cayman Islands and faced Cincinnati in their first game. The three-game tournament took place between November 20 and 22. 

|-
!colspan=9 style=|Exhibition

|-
!colspan=9 style=|Non-conference regular season

|-
!colspan=9 style=| MAC regular season

|-
!colspan=9 style=| MAC Tournament

|-
!colspan=9 style=| NCAA tournament
|-

Rankings

*AP does not release post-NCAA tournament rankings

References

Buffalo
Buffalo Bulls men's basketball seasons
Buffalo
Buffalo
Buffalo